Pina may refer to:

People
 Pina (name), a list of people with the given name, nickname, surname or stage name

Places
 Pina, Nepal,  a village development committee
 Pina, Mallorca, Spain, a town
 Pina de Ebro, a municipality of the province of Zaragoza, Spain
 Pina de Montalgrao, Valencia, Spain, a municipality
 Pina (river), in southwestern Belarus

Other
 6521 Pina, a main-belt asteroid
 Pina (film), a 2011 German 3D documentary film about dance choreographer Pina Bausch
 Pina Records, a Puerto Rican record label
 Rosh Pina, an independent minyan in Washington, D.C., United States

See also
 Piña (disambiguation)
 Pinas (disambiguation)
 Pena (disambiguation)
 Peña (disambiguation)